SS Transylvania was a British passenger liner of the Anchor Line, a subsidiary of the Cunard Line and a sister ship to . She was torpedoed and sunk on 4 May 1917 by the German U-boat  at  while carrying Allied troops to Egypt and sank with a loss of 412 lives.

History

Career
Completed just after the outbreak of World War I, The 14,348 GRT Transylvania was built in 1914 at the Scotts Shipbuilding and Engineering Company shipyard in the Scottish city of Greenock. The owner was the Anchor Line, which had been part of the Cunard Line since 1911. The 167.11 m long steamer was powered by two Parsons turbines and six Scotch steam boilers, which acted on two propellers and enabled a speed of 17.5 knots (35.2 km / h). She was taken over for service as a troopship from May 1915 the Admiralty fixed her capacity at 200 officers and 2,860 men, plus crew compared to the 1,379 passengers she was designed to carry.

Loss

At 10 am on 4 May Transylvania was struck in the port engine room by a torpedo fired by the German U-boat  under the command of Otto Schultze. Matsu came alongside Transylvania and began to take on board troops while Sakaki circled to force the submarine to remain submerged.

Twenty minutes later a second torpedo was seen coming straight for Matsu, which saved herself by going astern at full speed. The torpedo hit Transylvania instead, which sank immediately. Ten crew members, 29 army officers and 373 soldiers lost their lives.

Many bodies of victims were recovered at Savona and buried two days later, in a special plot in the town cemetery. Others are buried elsewhere in Italy, France, Monaco and Spain. Savona Town Cemetery contains 85 Commonwealth burials from the First World War, all but two of them casualties from Transylvania. Within the cemetery is the Savona Memorial which commemorates a further 275 casualties who died when Transylvania sank, but whose graves are unknown. Amongst those killed was the cricketer Major Richard Worsley .

Notes

External links
 IWM Interview with survivor Walter Williams

Ships built on the River Clyde
Ocean liners
Passenger ships of the United Kingdom
Steamships
Maritime incidents in 1917
Ships sunk by German submarines in World War I
World War I shipwrecks in the Mediterranean Sea
1914 ships